Albert Lawrence Juliussen (20 February 1920 – 1 January 1982) was an English footballer who played as a centre forward.

Early life
Juliussen was born in Blyth, Northumberland, son of Norwegian parents.

Club career

Early career
He began his career in 1938 as a reserve with Huddersfield Town as an apprentice, having joined them from Cramlington Black Watch as an apprentice. He also appeared twice for Mossley during the 1939–40 season.

During World War Two Juliussen was based in Perth, Scotland, as an instructor with the army, joining Dundee United initially as a triallist. His scoring record in season 1941–42 was extraordinary and in one match, against St Bernard's, he set the record for a Dundee United player with six goals in one game; he was top scorer in that season. He scored 87 goals in 73 wartime matches for the club. He also played one match (scoring one goal) as a wartime guest for Aberdeen in May 1945.

Dundee
On the eve of the 1945–46 season, Juliussen signed for Dundee with a fee of £2,000 being paid to Huddersfield. During his time with the club he scored 95 goals in 73 matches across three seasons, including 79 league goals in 53 league matches (though the first season was still within the unofficial Southern League and other associated wartime competitions). In 1945–46 and 1946–47, Dundee captured successive Scottish League 'B' Division titles, returning to the top flight for the 1947–48 season. His spell at Dens Park included scoring 13 goals (6 then 7) across two successive matches, both of which Dundee won 10–0, in March 1947.

Portsmouth
In May 1948 he signed for Portsmouth for £11,000. During his time with the club he made seven appearances, scoring four goals.

Everton
In September 1948 Juliussen joined Merseyside club Everton, making ten appearances and scoring one goal.  His final competitive match for the club took place on 18 December 1948 against Newcastle during which he was injured.

He spent the following summer looking for another club in Scotland, but eventually took up the player manager position at Consett, in Durham, with a house and job provided by the club as part of the agreement.

Berwick Rangers
He then signed for Berwick Rangers of the Scottish 'C' Division in August 1951, where he scored 49 times including 35 league goals in the 1951–52 and 1952–53 seasons.

Return to Dundee United
In August 1953 he returned to Dundee United, playing in three League Cup matches that month, scoring twice in one of the matches.

Brechin City
Juliussen joined Brechin City in 1954 when they were top of 'C' Division. He scored in one of the two matches before 400 fans travelled to the last match of the season against Celtic 'A', a match which attracted an 11,000 crowd. He scored the only goal to secure the title and Division 'B' status for the club.

References 

1920 births
1982 deaths
Scottish Football League players
Brechin City F.C. players
Dundee F.C. players
Dundee United F.C. players
People from Blyth, Northumberland
Footballers from Northumberland
English footballers
Association football forwards
Mossley A.F.C. players
Everton F.C. players
Portsmouth F.C. players
Dundee United F.C. wartime guest players
Huddersfield Town A.F.C. players
Consett A.F.C. managers
Consett A.F.C. players
Berwick Rangers F.C. players
English people of Norwegian descent
Aberdeen F.C. wartime guest players
English football managers
English Football League players
British Army personnel of World War II